Sandy Scofield is a Métis Canadian musician, and songwriter. She composed a piece for the 2010 Winter Olympics opening ceremony.

She won a "best song" award from Canadian Aboriginal Music Award. She won an "Aboriginal Recording of the Year," at the Western Canada Music Awards.

Life 
She graduated from Simon Fraser University.

She was a member of the  Crimpolines, Iskwew Singers, and Nitsiwakun. She collaborated with Doreen Manuel.

She appeared at Canadian folk festivals.

Discography 

 Dirty River, 1994
 Riel's Road, 2000
 Ketwam, 2002 
 Nikawiy Askiy, 2007
 Red Earth, 2022

References

External links 
 Official website

Living people
Canadian Métis people
21st-century Canadian women singers
Year of birth missing (living people)